A summer capital is a city used as an administrative capital during extended periods of particularly hot summer weather. The term is mostly of relevance in historical contexts of political systems with ruling classes that would migrate to a summer capital, making it less prevalent in modern times. The ubiquity of air conditioning systems also reduces the imperative to periodically relocate to summer capitals.

Summer capitals around the world

China
Shangdu (Xanadu) was an "Upper Capital" during Kublai Khan's reign in the 13th century.

In the Qing dynasty, Chengde Mountain Resort in Chengde was often being used by emperor to perform their official function during the summer months.

In the era of the Republic of China, core members of Nationalist Party of China often held meetings at Kuling, Jiujiang in summer to make important internal decisions. Foreign businessmen and missionaries also like to spend summer time in Kuling during ROC government rule.

In the era of the People's Republic of China, core members of the Chinese Communist Party often held meetings at Beidaihe District in the summer to make important internal decisions.

India
During the reign of Mughal emperor Babur, the city of Kabul in the north-west of the Mughal Empire was used as a summer capital due to its cooler temperatures compared to Agra and Delhi. This practise ended during emperor Aurangzeb.

In India, the government of the British Raj was annually transferred to Shimla during the summer months. This practice was stopped due to the difficulty of transporting officialdom, and the negative perceptions of the public about politicians and public servants making such a move. Srinagar is the summer capital of the union territory of Jammu and Kashmir. Nagpur is the winter capital of the Indian state of Maharashtra.

Philippines
The hill station of Baguio in the northern mountains of Luzon was selected as the summer capital of the Philippines during the American Occupation in the early 20th century. Its cool climate was a preferred alternative to the sweltering, humid climate of the de facto capital, Manila. While the present sovereign government has long stopped transferring there en masse, the city still hosts the official summer residence of the President of the Philippines, and the Supreme Court of the Philippines still maintains its "Summer Sessions" in the city, while it remains a popular holiday spot, especially around Christmas season, when temperatures are considerably lower than in the rest of the archipelago.

Russia
Following Russia's loss of the traditionally popular resorts of the Crimea (transferred away from the Russian SFSR to the Ukrainian SSR in 1954 by Nikita Khrushchev), Sochi emerged as the unofficial summer capital of the country. Additionally, Sochi has also served as the location for the signing of many treaties, especially those between the Georgian, separatist Abkhazian, and separatist South Ossetian governing authorities.

Saudi Arabia
The Saudi royal family has historically relocated to the mountainous city of Taif, near Mecca, which is far cooler in the summer months than the official capital of Saudi Arabia, Riyadh.

Spain
The location of San Sebastián in the cooler, northern seaside of Spain close to the French border ideally placed it as a summer capital alternative to Madrid. Maria Christina of Austria, the queen consort of Spain, vacationed there from 1887 and was followed by the court.
The dictator Francisco Franco spent the summers between 1941 and 1975 at the Ayete Palace.

See also
 List of countries with multiple capitals

Notes

Capitals
Summer